Southeast College (formerly Southeast Regional College) is a publicly funded regional college with six campuses in the southeast of the province of Saskatchewan, Canada. The college was created under the Regional Colleges Act of Saskatchewan. Its head office is located in Weyburn. The six campuses are located in Weyburn, Estevan, Moosomin, Assiniboia, Whitewood and Indian Head.

See also
Higher education in Saskatchewan
List of colleges in Canada#Saskatchewan

References

External links

Colleges in Saskatchewan
Vocational education in Canada
Weyburn